Fribourg may refer to:

Places
 Fribourg, capital of the Canton of Fribourg, Switzerland
 Canton of Fribourg, Switzerland
 Fribourg, France, town in the Moselle département, France
 Fribourg en Brisgau, Germany, French name of Freiburg im Breisgau, located near the French-German border
 Nova Friburgo ("New Fribourg" in English), a Brazilian town named for the Swiss canton.

People
 Fribourg (surname)

See also
 Friberg
 Freiburg (disambiguation)